Sir Henry Thompson (1625–1683) was an English merchant and politician.

Life and politics
Henry and his brother Edward Thompson were wine merchants of York. He was Lord Mayor of York in 1663, and was made a deputy lieutenant of the West Riding of Yorkshire in 1665. In 1668, Henry moved from York to a new country estate at Escrick, where he had been buying land for the past several years. After moving to Escrick, he briefly entered politics, and was a patron of Andrew Marvell. He moved once more before his death, to another estate at Long Marston, leaving Escrick to his eldest son. He was again Lord Mayor in 1672.

By his first wife, Mary Thompson, he had no children. By his second, Jane Newton (d. 1661), he had one son, Henry Thompson (1659–1700), to whom he left Escrick. By his third wife, Susannah Lovell (d. 1701), he had several children, including Edward Thompson (1670–1734), who would inherit Long Marston. Edward's eldest son, Edward Thompson (1697–1742), would become a prominent politician; Edward (senior)'s daughter, Henrietta, was the mother of James Wolfe. His third wife, Susannah was twice widowed. 

His entry into politics in 1673 was contentious. One of the previous incumbents, Sir Thomas Osborne, had tried to stop Henry from taking his seat after he thought his son had been assured to be the favoured candidate.

References

1620s births
1683 deaths
Deputy Lieutenants of the West Riding of Yorkshire
Lord Mayors of York
17th-century merchants
English MPs 1661–1679
English MPs 1679
English MPs 1680–1681
English MPs 1681